Eric White may refer to:
 Eric White (basketball) (born 1965), American basketball player
 Eric White (artist) (born 1968), American artist
 Eric White (footballer) (born 1942), Australian rules footballer
 Eric Foster White (born 1962), American songwriter, record producer, and musician
 Eric Wyndham White (1913–1980), British economist
 Eric Winston White (born 1958), English footballer
 Eric White, actor in Something More!

See also 
 Erik White, American film and music video director